The Sámi National Day is an ethnic national day for the Sámi (Saami) people that falls on February 6, the date when the first Sámi congress was held in 1917 in Trondheim, Norway. The congress was the first time that Norwegian and Swedish Sámi came together across national borders to work on finding solutions to common problems.

In 1992, at the 15th Sámi Conference in Helsinki, Finland, a resolution was passed that Sámi National Day should be celebrated on February 6 to commemorate the first Sámi congress in 1917. Sami National Day is for all Sámi, regardless of where they live and on that day the Sámi flag should be flown and the Sámi anthem is sung in the local Sámi language. The first time Sami National Day was celebrated was in 1993, when the International Year of Indigenous People was proclaimed open in Jokkmokk, Sweden by the United Nations.

Since then, celebrating the day has become increasingly popular. In Norway it is compulsory for municipal administrative buildings to fly the Norwegian flag, and optionally also the Sami flag, on February 6. Particularly notable is the celebration in Norway's capital Oslo, where the bells in the highest tower of Oslo City Hall play the Sami national anthem as the flags go up. Some larger places have taken to arranging festivities also in the week around the Sami National Day. The National Day has been included in the almanacs published by the University of Helsinki since 2004. The Norwegian, Swedish and Finnish authorities recommend general flagging on the day.

By coincidence, February 6 was also the date representatives of the Sámi of the Kola Peninsula gathered annually to meet with Russian bureaucrats to debate and decide on issues of relevance to them. This assembly, called the Kola Sobbar, has been dubbed the "first Sámi Parliament" by the researcher Johan Albert Kalstad. However, the founding of the Kola Sobbar did not influence the choice of the date for Sámi People's Day, as the assembly existed only during the late 1800s and was largely forgotten until the early 2000s.

See also
Sámi anthem
Sámi culture
Waitangi Day

Notes

References

External links
 

Sámi
National days
February observances
Indigenous peoples days